XHUDC-FM is a Mexican college radio station owned by the Universidad de Colima. It is known as Universo FM and broadcasts on 94.9 MHz.

History
XHUDC signed on the air in 2002 after receiving its permit in 2000. The university had initially attempted to get a radio station in the 1980s, but transmitter problems and turbulence at other university radio stations caused the permit to be canceled.

The station took to the air with music and a test signal in the spring of 2002. Full programming commenced on June 1, and the station quickly found itself useful after a 7.6 magnitude earthquake struck the state in October 2002. XHUDC was the first station back on air, as it still had power, and was thus the only station available for a time.

References

Radio stations in Colima
University radio stations in Mexico
Mass media in Colima City